The A410 autoroute is a short motorway in France. Running through the French Alps, the road runs from West to East connecting the A40 and A41 autoroutes.

Characteristics
 2x2 lanes

Junctions

 Exchange A40-A410
  19 La Roche-sur-Foron

External links

A410 autoroute in Saratlas

A410